Elisabeth Anne Broderick (née Bisceglia; born November 7, 1947) is an American woman who murdered her ex-husband, Daniel T. Broderick III, and his second wife, Linda (née Kolkena) Broderick, on November 5, 1989. At a second trial that began on December 11, 1991, she was convicted of two counts of second-degree murder and later sentenced to 32-years-to-life in prison. The case received extensive media attention. Several books were written on the Broderick case, and a TV movie was televised in two parts. In 2020, an 8-episode miniseries was produced and aired about Broderick.

Early life
Betty Broderick was born Elisabeth Anne Bisceglia on November 7, 1947 and grew up in Bronxville, New York. She was the third of six children born to Marita (née Curtin; 1919–2007) and Frank Bisceglia (1915–1998), who owned a successful plastering business with relatives. Her mother was Irish American and her father was Italian American.

The Bisceglias were strict parents, and much was expected of all the Bisceglia children. As Broderick later recalled, she was being trained to be a housewife since the day she was born, or as she recalled: "Go to Catholic schools, be careful with dating until you find a Catholic man, support him while he works, be blessed in your later years with beautiful grandchildren".

Broderick graduated from Maria Regina High School, in Hartsdale, New York, in 1965. She graduated from the College of Mount Saint Vincent in the Bronx, where she earned a degree in early childhood education through an accelerated program. Her credits also earned her a minor in English.

Engagement and marriage
In 1965, Elisabeth (Betty) met her future husband, Dan Broderick (1944–1989), at the University of Notre Dame, Indiana. Dan was born in Pittsburgh, Pennsylvania, the eldest son of a very large Irish Catholic family. The couple married on April 12, 1969 at the Immaculate Conception Church in Tuckahoe, New York. Betty returned from the honeymoon pregnant with their first child, daughter Kim (b. 1970). She gave birth to four more children: daughter Lee (b. 1971), sons named Daniel (b. 1976) and Rhett (b. 1979), and an unnamed boy, who died four days after birth.

Marriage breakdown

After Kim's birth, Dan completed his M.D. degree. He then announced his intention to combine his medical expertise with a J.D. degree and enrolled at Harvard Law School. Betty was the main provider for the family while Dan attended law school with the help of a student loan. Dan was quickly hired by a law firm in San Diego, California, and moved his family to the San Diego community of La Jolla. Betty continued working part-time, often selling Tupperware or Avon products while raising the children.

In the fall of 1982, Dan hired 21-year-old Dutch American Linda Kolkena (1961–1989), a former Delta Air Lines flight attendant, to be his legal assistant. As early as October 1983, Betty suspected that Dan was having an affair with Kolkena, but Dan denied it. Against Betty's wishes, Dan moved out in February 1985. He eventually took custody of their children after Betty left the children on his doorstep one by one. Betty claimed that Dan confessed he had in fact been having an affair with Kolkena, and a long, drawn-out, and hostile divorce ensued.

By this time, Dan Broderick had become a prominent local lawyer, serving as the president of the San Diego Bar Association. Betty claimed that Dan made it extremely difficult for her to find a lawyer willing to represent her in the divorce, which put her at a distinct disadvantage. Betty also believed that Dan used his legal influence to win sole custody of their children, sell their house against her wishes and cheat her out of her rightful share of his income.

The divorce was finalized in 1989, four years after Dan filed the petition. Betty Broderick's behavior became increasingly erratic. She left hundreds of profane messages on Dan's answering machine, and ignored numerous restraining orders that forbade her from setting foot on Dan's property. She vandalized his new home, and even drove her car into his front door despite the fact that their children were inside the house at the time.

On April 22, 1989, Dan and Kolkena were married. Kolkena had been concerned about Betty's behavior and even urged Dan to wear a bulletproof vest to their wedding. However, Betty did not arrive and the wedding proceeded without incident. After the wedding, Betty Broderick claimed that Linda Broderick taunted her by mailing her facial cream and slimming treatment ads.

Murders
Eight months after buying a Smith & Wesson revolver and seven months after Dan and Linda were married, Betty Broderick drove to Dan's house at 1041 Cypress Avenue in the Marston Hills neighborhood near Balboa Park in San Diego. Betty used a key she had taken from her daughter Lee to enter the house while the couple slept, whereupon she shot and killed them. The murders occurred at 5:30 a.m. on November 5, 1989—two days before Betty's 42nd birthday. Two bullets hit Linda in the head and chest, killing her instantly; one bullet hit Dan in the chest as he apparently was reaching for the phone; one bullet hit the wall, and one bullet hit a nightstand. Dan was 17 days shy of his 45th birthday; Linda was 28.

Evidence was presented at her trial that Betty had removed a phone/answering machine from Dan Broderick's bedroom so that he could not call for help. Medical evidence indicated that Dan had not died right away, and Betty claimed that she had spoken to him after she had shot him.

After contacting her daughter, Lee, and Lee's boyfriend, Betty turned herself in to police, never denying that she had pulled the trigger. Betty's explanation at both trials was that she never planned to kill Dan and Linda and that her crime was not premeditated. Her account of the murders at her second trial was that she was startled by Kolkena screaming "Call the police!" and immediately fired the gun.

Linda and Dan Broderick are listed as having been buried together, at Greenwood Memorial Park in San Diego.

Trials
Criminal Defense Attorney Jack Early represented Broderick at trial. Kerry Wells prosecuted for the State of California. Broderick's defense was that she had been a battered wife, claiming that she was driven over the edge by years of psychological, physical, and mental abuse at the hands of her ex-husband. Wells portrayed Broderick as a murderer who planned and schemed to kill her ex-husband and argued to the jury that Broderick was not a battered woman.

Forensic psychiatrist and criminologist Dr. Park Dietz, for the prosecution, used the analysis of Dr. Melvin Goldzband, who previously worked on the case for the prosecution. Dietz said Broderick has histrionic and narcissistic personality disorders. Goldzband had likewise diagnosed Broderick as "severely narcissistic" and "histrionic," and clinical psychologist Katherine DiFrancesca, testifying for the defense, concluded Broderick was "histrionic" with "narcissistic features".

The lead detective in the case was Terry DeGelder of San Diego Homicide, who provided testimony for the prosecution.

Broderick's first trial ended with a hung jury when two of the jurors held out for manslaughter, citing lack of intent. A mistrial was declared by Judge Thomas J. Whelan. Betty Broderick was retried a year later with the same defense attorney and prosecutor. The second trial was essentially a replay of the first trial. Prosecutor Wells was successful the second time around; the jury returned a verdict of two counts of second-degree murder. Broderick was sentenced to two consecutive terms of 15 years to life plus two years for illegal use of a firearm, the maximum under the law. She has been incarcerated since the day she committed the murders.

Broderick is serving her sentence at the California Institution for Women (CIW), in Chino, California. In January 2010, her first request for parole was denied by the Board of Parole Hearings because she did not show remorse and did not acknowledge wrongdoing. She was denied parole in November 2011 and again in January 2017. She will not be eligible again until January 2032, at which date she will be 84 years old.

In popular culture
An article about Broderick's case in the Los Angeles Times Magazine led to the production of a television film called (Part 1) A Woman Scorned: The Betty Broderick Story, and (Part 2) Her Final Fury: Betty Broderick, The Last Chapter (1992), where Meredith Baxter portrayed Betty, Stephen Collins portrayed Dan, and Michelle Johnson portrayed Linda Kolkena. Baxter received an Emmy Award nomination for her portrayal of Broderick. The murder was also dramatized in the season 4 episode of Deadly Women, titled "Till Death Do Us Part."

Both before and after Broderick's trials, her story was dramatized across the United States. Broderick granted numerous television and magazine interviews. She appeared on The Oprah Winfrey Show twice, Hard Copy, 20/20, and Headliners and Legends.

At least four books were written about her story (Until the Twelfth of Never: The Deadly Divorce of Dan and Betty Broderick, 1993, by Bella Stumbo; Until the Twelfth of Never - Should Betty Broderick ever be free?, 2013, by Bella Stumbo; Forsaking All Others: The Real Betty Broderick Story, 1993, by Loretta Schwartz-Nobel; and Hell Hath No Fury, 1992, by Bryna Taubman). Broderick was interviewed by Ladies Home Journal magazine and others.

The 1991 Law & Order episode "The Wages of Love" partially was inspired by this murder and the trial that followed. Guest star Shirley Knight was nominated for a Primetime Emmy Award for Outstanding Lead Actress in a Drama Series.

Karen Kilgariff covered the case in episode 103 of My Favorite Murder, recorded live in San Diego.

The second season of the TV series Dirty John features the story of Betty and Dan Broderick from the early years through the homicides. Amanda Peet played Betty and Christian Slater played Dan.

In spring 2020, a true crime podcast about the Betty Broderick case was produced by the Los Angeles Times titled It Was Simple: The Betty Broderick Murders.

On July 15, 2020, Oxygen aired a special episode of Snapped devoted to the Betty Broderick case.

Court cases
Betty Broderick was involved in several civil and criminal court cases, including wrongful death for the murder of Dan Broderick and his wife Linda:
 Property damage case filed by Dan and Betty Broderick on October 1, 1975
 Personal injury (auto) case filed against Betty Broderick on April 20, 1989
 Double homicide case filed March 23, 1990
 Civil complaint filed by Betty Broderick on June 28, 1990
 Wrongful death suit against Betty Broderick filed on November 2, 1990
 Second wrongful death suit against Betty Broderick filed on November 2, 1990
 Personal injury case against Betty Broderick filed on September 18, 1991
 Betty Broderick sues County of San Diego on September 21, 1992

See also
 List of homicides in California

References

Further reading

External links

No parole for 'Angry Betty' Broderick (CNN, 2010)

1947 births
Living people
20th-century American criminals
American female murderers
American people convicted of murder
Criminals from New York (state)
Eastchester High School alumni
People convicted of murder by California
People from Eastchester, New York
People from La Jolla, San Diego
People with histrionic personality disorder
People with narcissistic personality disorder
Prisoners sentenced to life imprisonment by California
Mariticides
College of Mount Saint Vincent alumni